Dusty Groove is a Chicago-based online record store specializing in new and vintage jazz, funk, soul, hip-hop, world, rare, collectible, and vinyl records and CDs.

History

Online record store
Founded in 1996 by University of Chicago alumni Rick Wojcik and JP Schauer as an online-only record store, the website dustygroove.com soon attracted the interest of global record collectors. The site has been featured in publications such as The New York Times, Rolling Stone, Billboard, The Wire, Spin, GQ, Esquire, and Vibe.

Retail operations
Dusty Groove operated its mail-based shipping business an office in the Hyde Park neighborhood of Chicago  before moving to a loft in Wicker Park in 1997, adding a brick-and-mortar retail storefront with weekend hours. The store opened for business daily 2001, expanding to a nearby location where it remains.  Dusty Groove maintains an extensive warehouse and retail presence with up to 30,000 items in inventory at any given time and several hundred new titles added on a daily basis. Hundreds of orders are shipped every week day from its Wicker Park location to customers around the world, and the store maintains a prominent local presence in Chicago.

Record label
The "Dusty Groove America" record label was started in 2007,  to license rare funk, soul, Latin, jazz, and Brazilian titles from Universal and Sony Music. This permitted the store to produce and distribute re-issues or re-releases of almost two dozen CDs,  most of which are now rare and long out of print. The label opened their reissue series with the release of Brazilian musician Jorge Ben's 1970 album Fôrça Bruta. The label continued as a partnership with Real Gone Music  in 2012. 

The store itself was branded as Dusty Groove America until 2012, when it shortened its name to reflect its growing international customer base and to emphasize the parent corporation's official trademark. Coincidentally, the phrase dusty groove has also appeared in the titles of songs by artists as diverse as Kelly Hogan, the New Mastersounds,  Mushroom,  and Don Caballero.

Recent activities

Large acquisitions
Dusty Groove is known for procuring large music collections from individuals, organizations, and other record stores.  Buyers regularly travel throughout the US and internationally to purchase music. In 2012, the store acquired Chicago-based radio station WGN's vinyl record collection which included upwards of 40,000 titles dating to the 1950s. On numerous occasions the store has bought collections from different institutions and private collectors with units numbering in the several thousands.

Special events and open-air markets
Dusty Groove participates in Record Store Day annually, and has been featured at the Renegade Craft Fair and other open-air markets and street festivals in the Chicago area. It has sold collectible music at several pop-up locations, usually in neighborhoods where few retail music outlets are established.

In 2016, the store celebrated its twentieth anniversary with a block party.

Website revisions
In 2013, a website revision was initiated to allow fine-grain search and inspection of product inventory based on genre, format, price, release decade, new vs. used status, and label (in addition to artist name and title). This simulates a virtual "crate digging" experience  for dedicated audiophiles and casual record and CD buyers alike. Newly added products are grouped by genre to permit regular customers to quickly scan inventory changes, mirroring a "new arrivals" bin often found in a typical used record store. Dusty Groove's staff writes all product descriptions and scans all album and CD covers, providing a unique combination of written and visual information that is generally unavailable from other retailers or online music catalogs.

Awards and recognition
The business is consistently regarded as one of the best record stores in Chicago by critics and customers alike.  In 2010 it was recognized as one of the Best Record Stores in the US by Rolling Stone, and in 2011 by Time, The Wall Street Journal, and Reader's Digest. The store has been cited as being among the leaders in the revival of vinyl record sales.

In 2019, a feature-length documentary about the store and its relationship with the Chicago music community was released.

Discography
Albums reissued on CD under the Dusty Groove label include:
Badfoot Brown & the Bunions Bradford Funeral & Marching Band
The Dells Sing Dionne Warwicke's Greatest Hits
Força Bruta
Gal (1969 album)
Gal Costa
Gin and Orange
Jorge Ben
Jungle Fever
The Rubaiyat of Dorothy Ashby
Seasons – Pete Jolly
Seriously Deep

See also

Avant-garde jazz
High fidelity
High-end audio
Independent music
Online music store
Rare groove
Record collecting
WBEZ (Dusty Groove sponsors the program Radio-M)
WHPK (University of Chicago station where Dusty Groove's founders used to DJ)

References

External links

Dusty Groove: The Sound of Transition - documentary trailer on Vimeo

Business and industry organizations based in Chicago
Independent stores
Music retailers of the United States
Online music stores of the United States
Reissue record labels